In Freemasonry, a Rite is a series of progressive degrees that are conferred by various Masonic organizations or bodies, each of which operates under the control of its own central authority. In many cases, such as the York Rite, it can be a collection of separate Masonic organizations that would otherwise operate independently. Masonic degree systems frequently belong to the appendant bodies of Freemasonry that a Master Mason may join after the degrees of the Blue Lodge.

Masonic degree systems
Over time, a number of different Masonic degree systems have been developed, some of which are still in use, and others which have now ceased to exist. Known Masonic degree systems include:
 Adonhiramite Rite
 Ancient and Accepted Scottish Rite
 Ancient and Primitive Rite
 Brazillian Rite
 French Rite
 Moorish Rite
 National Mexican Rite
 Primitive Scottish Rite 
 Rectified Scottish Rite
 Rite Français Moderne Rétabli
 Rite of Adoption
 Rite of Baldwyn
 Rite of Memphis 
 Rite of Memphis Misraim
 Rite of Misraim
 Rite of Strict Observance
 Rite Opératif de Salomon
 Schröder Rite
 Swedish Rite
 York Rite

Grand College of Rites
In the United States, the Grand College of Rites focuses on the collection and publication of texts from both Masonic ritual not currently used in the United States, and defunct quasi-Masonic rituals used by other fraternities and societies. One of its stated purposes is the prevention, within the larger community of Freemasons, of the revival or usage of any rituals that are not currently in use in the United States.

References

See also
 Grand College of Rites